Sportclub Austria Lustenau is a professional association football club based in the town of Lustenau, Vorarlberg, Austria, that competes in the Austrian Football Bundesliga, the top tier of the Austrian football league system. Founded in 1914, it is affiliated to the Vorarlberg Football Association. The team plays its home matches at Reichshofstadion, where it has been based since 1951. The club's history includes several cup finals, numerous promotions and relegations, and some spells of sustained success.

The club won the 2021–22 Austrian Football Second League and will return to the Austrian Football Bundesliga for the 2022–23 season for the first time in 22 years.

Current squad
Updated 18 January 2023.

Out on loan

Former players

  Murad Gerdi

Club Officials

Manager history

From 1992 onwards

  Peter Assion (1992–1994)
  Edi Stöhr (1994–1999)
  Klaus Scheer (1999)
  Goran Stanisavljević (2000)
  Wolfgang Schwarz (2000–2001)
  Edi Stöhr (2001–2003)
  Andreas Heraf (2003–2005)
  Heinz Fuchsbichler (2005–2007)
  Hans Kleer (2007–2009)
  Edi Stöhr (2009–2011)
  Helgi Kolviðsson (2011–2014)
  Mladen Posavec (2014–2015)
  Lassaad Chabbi (2015–2017) 
  Daniel Ernemann (2017)
  Andreas Lipa (2017)
  Daniel Ernemann (2017)
  Gernot Plassnegger (2017–2019)
  Roman Mählich (2019–2020)
  Alexander Kiene (2020–2021)
  Markus Mader (2021–present)

Honours
Austrian Cup
Runners-up (2): 2010–11, 2019–20
Austrian Football Second League
Champions: 2021–22

See also
 List of football (soccer) clubs
 List of football clubs in Austria

References

External links
  Official website

 
Association football clubs established in 1914
Football clubs in Austria
1914 establishments in Austria
Sport in Vorarlberg